Tivetshall was a railway station on the Great Eastern Main Line located in Tivetshall, Norfolk. It was also the western terminus of the Waveney Valley Line from Beccles. It served six small parishes in an agricultural area.

History

Design and opening
It was first opened when Norwich and London were connected by the Eastern Union Railway in 1849. The EUR was taken over by the Eastern Counties Railway before becoming the Great Eastern Railway in 1862. The station building, located on the down side of the main line, was believed to have been designed by Frederick Barnes (architect) who was responsible for designing a number of other stations at this time in East Anglia.

19th century
In 1855, the Waveney Valley Line was opened as far as Harleston; it was extended to Bungay in 1860 and finally on to Beccles.

A new signal box was provided in 1880 and this lasted 106 years. Immediately south of the station was a level crossing, which spanned all three tracks (the two main lines and platform road for the Waveney Valley line). A small goods yard was provided north of the station on the down side of the line and a small maltings (operated by Watney Combe & Reid in the 1960s) was also served by rail.

In the 1880s, there were four main line trains each way serving Tivetshall and five trains serving the Waveney Valley line. In 1881, the GER built a timber waiting room on the up side of the station.

Water troughs were installed near Tivetshall station in 1896, which allowed trains to pick up water without stopping. These were taken out of service in 1945, but the station had three water cranes.

20th century
On 31 August 1907, Arthur Hardiment attempted to save an 18 month old toddler from an oncoming express train. The toddler got clear, but Hardiment was struck by the engine suffering injury as a result. For this action, he was awarded the Albert Medal Second Class for gallantry receiving his award at Windsor Castle from King Edward VII on 13 November the same year.

In 1923, the operation of Tivetshall station was taken over by the London and North Eastern Railway. Some additional sidings were added during the Second World War for traffic to local airfields.

Following nationalisation in 1948, the station became part of the Eastern Region of British Railways.

In the early 1950s, there were eight main-line trains each way serving Tivetshall and seven trains serving the Waveney Valley line.

Decline and closure
Passenger services on the Waveney Valley line ceased in 1953; goods services continued on the line until 1966.

1966 also saw an end to the local main line freight services in April and, with the withdrawal of the local Ipswich to Norwich passenger service, the station closed on 7 November.

The signal box survived for a further twenty years but, following resignalling and electrification of the line, this closed. At this time, the remaining station buildings were demolished although the goods shed was still extant in 1994.

Former services

References

Disused railway stations in Norfolk
Former Great Eastern Railway stations
Railway stations in Great Britain opened in 1849
Railway stations in Great Britain closed in 1966
1849 establishments in England